Green Oaks is a village in Libertyville Township, Lake County, Illinois, United States. Per the 2020 census, the population was 4,128.

Geography
Green Oaks is located at  (42.289106, -87.911499).

Major streets
  Tri-State Tollway
  Buckley Road
  Park Avenue/Rockland Road
 O'Plaine Road
 St. Mary's Road
 Bradley Road
 Atkinson Road

Public schools serving Green Oaks
 Rondout School District 72
 Oak Grove School District 68
 Libertyville High School (District 128)

Demographics

2020 census

2000 Census
At the 2000 census, there were 3,572 people, 1,079 households and 977 families living in the village. The racial makeup of the village was 90.85% White, 1.74% African American, 0.14% Native American, 5.46% Asian, 0.42% from other races, and 1.40% from two or more races. Hispanic or Latino of any race were 2.63% of the population.

There were 1,079 households, of which 52.5% had children under the age of 18 living with them, 86.2% were married couples living together, 3.4% had a female householder with no husband present, and 9.4% were non-families. 7.6% of all households were made up of individuals, and 2.2% had someone living alone who was 65 years of age or older. The average household size was 3.26 and the average family size was 3.44.

33.4% of the population were under the age of 18, 4.2% from 18 to 24, 28.1% from 25 to 44, 27.2% from 45 to 64, and 7.1% who were 65 years of age or older. The median age was 37 years. For every 100 females, there were 101.0 males. For every 100 females age 18 and over, there were 98.5 males.

According to the 2019 American Community Survey from the United States Census Bureau, the median household income was $165,625, and the median family income was $184,000. An estimated 4.5% of families and 7.0% of the population were below the poverty line, including 1.5% of those under age 18 and 11.0% of those age 65 or over.

As of the 2010 US Census, there were 3,866 people living in the village. The racial makeup of the village was 86.60% White, 1.40% African American, 0.05% Native American, 8.46% Asian, 0.62% from other races, and 2.87% from two or more races. Hispanic or Latino of any race were 3.31% of the population.

Green Oaks does not have a post office, and therefore all locations within the town are addressed to Libertyville, Illinois, Lake Forest, Illinois, and Lake Bluff, Illinois.

References

External links
Village of Green Oaks official website

Villages in Illinois
Villages in Lake County, Illinois